Lin Tzu-yao (born 25 October 1967) is a Taiwanese weightlifter. He competed in the men's bantamweight event at the 1992 Summer Olympics.

References

1967 births
Living people
Taiwanese male weightlifters
Olympic weightlifters of Taiwan
Weightlifters at the 1992 Summer Olympics
Place of birth missing (living people)